"Wherever You Are" is a song recorded by American country music artist Jack Ingram.  It was Ingram's first Top 40 single on the U.S. Billboard Hot Country Songs charts. It was released in November 2005 as the lead-off single to Ingram's first album for Big Machine Records, Live: Wherever You Are.

Background
"Wherever You Are" was originally slated to be recorded by Canadian country music artist Deric Ruttan, as well as the band Rushlow. In 2005, Scott Borchetta, who had just founded the Big Machine label, discovered the song, and recommended it to Ingram, one of the acts signed to his label. Ingram recorded it as one of two studio tracks for his otherwise-live album Live: Wherever You Are, from which it was released as a single in late 2005.

The song was Ingram's ninth release and first Top 40 chart entry. It was the first Number One country single for Big Machine Records and co-writer Jeremy Stover, who wrote the song with Steve Bogard.

Music video
The music video was directed by David McClister and premiered in early 2006. It features Jack performing in different locations including a desert, a garage, and in a room with purple lights.

Chart positions

Year-end charts

References

2005 singles
2005 songs
Big Machine Records singles
Jack Ingram songs
Song recordings produced by Jeremy Stover
Songs written by Jeremy Stover
Songs written by Steve Bogard